Bakacak can refer to:

 Bakacak, Biga
 Bakacak, Bismil
 Bakacak, Gölyaka
 Bakacak, Refahiye